Roberto Gomes Pedrosa (8 July 1913 – 6 January 1954), known as Pedrosa, is a former Brazilian football player. He has played for Brazil national team in the 1934 FIFA World Cup. There was a tournament named after him.

References

1913 births
1954 deaths
Brazilian footballers
Brazil international footballers
1934 FIFA World Cup players
Botafogo de Futebol e Regatas players
São Paulo FC players
Association football goalkeepers
Footballers from Rio de Janeiro (city)